HMS Albatross was a 4-gun Fantome-class sloop built for the Royal Navy in the mid-1870s.

History
In May 1886, she was driven ashore at Hong Kong whilst going to the assistance of the British ship Dafila, which had also driven ashore. Both vessels were refloated, and HMS Albatross towed Dafila in to Hoikow, China.

Notes

Bibliography

 

 

Fantome-class sloops
Ships built in Chatham
1873 ships
Victorian-era sloops of the United Kingdom
Maritime incidents in May 1886